Thomas Harvey may refer to:

 Thomas Harvey (Royal Navy officer) (1775–1841), British Royal Naval officer
 Thomas Harvey (North Carolina governor) (1668–1699), colonial governor of North Carolina
 Thomas Arnold Harvey (1878–1966), Irish sportsman and clergyman
 Thomas Stoltz Harvey (1912–2007), American pathologist, performed autopsy on Albert Einstein's brain
 Edmund Harvey (social reformer) (Thomas Edmund Harvey, 1875–1955), British MP for Leeds West, 1910–1918, Dewsbury, 1923–1924, and Combined English Universities, 1937–1945
 Thomas Harvey (16th-century MP) (c. 1512–1577), British MP for Orford
 Thomas Harvey (cyclist) (1888–?), British cyclist at the 1920 Summer Olympics
 Thomas B. Harvey (1827–1889), medical doctor who served as the examining surgeon for Union soldiers in Indianapolis
 Thomas H. Harvey Jr. (1936–2013), American Army officer
 Thomas J. Harvey (born 1982), Canadian politician in New Brunswick
 Thomas W. Harvey (1893–1978), African-American activist, President of the Universal Negro Improvement Association and African Communities League
 Thomas Harvey, Rector of Edinburgh Academy
 Tom Harvey, English media executive and playwright
 Tom Harvey (cricketer) (born 1980), English cricketer for Kent and Cambridgeshire

See also
 Thomas Hervey (disambiguation)